Merdzavan, is a village in the Armavir Province of Armenia, located at the western suburbs of the capital Yerevan, north of the Parakar village.

As of the 2011 official census, Merdzavan has a population of 3,303.

Geography
At a height of 945 meters above sea level, Merdzavan is located to the western edge of the Malatia-Sebastia District of the capital Yerevan. It is 40 km east of the provincial centre Armavir and 6 km east of Vagharshapat.

See also 
Armavir Province

References 

Populated places in Armavir Province
Populated places established in 1947
Cities and towns built in the Soviet Union
1947 establishments in the Soviet Union